Wirnt von Grafenberg was a Middle High German poet of the thirteenth century.

Biography
Grafenberg was a Bavarian nobleman who between 1202 and 1205 wrote an epic, entitled Wigalois, which describes the adventures of Gawain's son, the name being a corruption of Guinglain le Galois. Wirnt took his material from the French romance Le bel inconnu of Renaud de Beaujeu, and used it with great freedom. Though extravagant and didactic, the poem is one of the best romances of the Arthurian cycle written in Germany, apart from the work of Wolfram von Eschenbach and Hartmann von Aue. A prose version was made toward the close of the fifteenth century and printed at Augsburg in 1493. Wigalois was edited by F. Pfeiffer (Leipzig, 1847).

References
 This work in turn cites:
 F. Saran, Beiträge zur Geschichte der deutschen Sprache und Litteratur, vol. xxi. (Halle, 1896).

Date of birth unknown
Date of death unknown
German-language poets
13th-century German poets